Hot Ice is a 1952 British comedy crime film directed by Kenneth Hume and starring John Justin, Barbara Murray and Ivor Barnard. It was released as a second feature. It is based on the 1934 novel Weekend at Thrackley by Alan Melville and its subsequent play version.  An eccentric invites an assortment of guests to his country house, planning to rob them of their valuables.

Cast
 John Justin as Jim Henderson 
 Barbara Murray as Mary 
 Ivor Barnard as Edwin Carson 
 John Penrose as Freddie Usher 
 Michael Balfour as Jacobson
 Gabrielle Brune as Marcella 
 Anthony Pendrell as Burroughs 
 Bill Shine as Henry 
 Fred Gray
 Dorothy Wheatley as Marilyn 
 Sam Kydd as Adams 
 Derek Sydney as Kenrick 
 Archie Duncan as Wilson 
 Keith Grieve as Constable #1
 Billy Howard as Constable #2 
 Ida Patlanski as Mrs. Bertram
 Freddie Tripp as Club Waiter 
 Kendal Chalmers as Man in Club

References

Bibliography
 Chibnall, Steve & McFarlane, Brian. The British 'B' Film. Palgrave MacMillan, 2009.

External links
 

1952 films
British crime comedy films
1950s crime comedy films
Films set in England
1952 comedy films
British black-and-white films
1950s English-language films
1950s British films